AFHS may refer to:

 Agua Fria High School, Avondale, Arizona, US
 American Falls High School, American Falls, Idaho, US
 American Fork High School, American Fork, Utah, US
 Apex Friendship High School, Apex, North Carolina, US
 Austintown-Fitch High School, Austintown, Ohio, US

See also 
 AFH (disambiguation)